Doctor Crippen Lives is a 1958 West German crime film directed by Erich Engels and starring Elisabeth Müller, Peter van Eyck and Fritz Tillmann. It was made at the Wandsbek Studios of Real Film in Hamburg. The film's sets were designed by the art director Dieter Bartels.

The most successful film of director Erich Engels was Doctor Crippen (1942), a film about Hawley Harvey Crippen. The 1958 film Doctor Crippen Lives has no relation to the 1942 film or to the case of Hawley Harvey Crippen.

Cast
 Elisabeth Müller as Fleur Blanchard
 Peter van Eyck as Kriminalkommissar Léon Ferrier
 Fritz Tillmann as Kriminalinspektor Steen
 Carl Lange as Aristide Coq, Buchhändler
 Günter Pfitzmann as Pierre, Kriminalassistent
 Inge Meysel as Delphine, Haushälterin
 Katharina Mayberg as Maja, malaisische Studentin
 Hans Zesch-Ballot as Prosecutor
 Robert Meyn as Chefinspektor Smith
 Hans Stiebner as Lung, chinesischer Steward
 Richard Münch as Reverend Bennet
 Werner Schumacher
 Manfred Steffen
 Howard Vernon
 Heinz Klingenberg
 Fred Raul as
 Benno Gellenbeck
 Friedrich Schütter as Polizist
 Hermann Kner
 Günther Jerschke as Gendarm
 Karl Heinz Wüpper
 Reiner Brönneke

References

Bibliography 
 Davidson, John & Hake, Sabine. Framing the Fifties: Cinema in a Divided Germany. Berghahn Books, 2007.

External links 
 

1958 films
1958 crime films
German crime films
West German films
1950s German-language films
Films directed by Erich Engels
Real Film films
Films shot at Wandsbek Studios
1950s German films